was a Japanese heavy metal band originally formed as Flatbacker in the spring of 1982 in Sapporo, Japan out of the remnants of two high school bands, Power-Station and Scrap. EZO has been named a "seminal influence by such artists as Steve McDonald of Redd Kross and Michael Steele of The Bangles."

History
EZO consisted of Masaki Yamada (vocals), Taro Takahashi (bass), Shoyo Iida (guitar) and Hiro Homma (drums). They released one demo cassette (Minagoroshi) in 1984 and two albums (1985's Senzo and 1986's Esa) in Japan as Flatbacker in the mid-1980s before coming to the U.S. Rumor has it that Gene Simmons of Kiss, who produced their self-titled U.S. debut album, was behind the band's name change to EZO, inspired by Ezo, an ancient name for Hokkaidō. They released two albums for Geffen Records, 1987's EZO and 1989's Fire Fire, before being dropped from the label and internal differences led to the band's demise.

Vocalist Masaki Yamada joined fellow Japanese metalheads Loudness in 1992 and drummer Hiro Homma joined Loudness in 1994. In 2000, the original Loudness lineup reunited and Masaki and Hiro left the band. Hiro Homma was the drummer for the Japanese metal band Anthem from 2001 to 2013 and vocalist Masaki Yamada is now the bass player for the New York-based band FiRESiGN.

A single guitar riff from EZO song "House of 1,000 Pleasures" served as the signature sound of syndicated radio network Z Rock.

Discography

Studio albums

Videos

See also
List of glam metal bands and artists

References

Bibliography

Musical groups established in 1982
Musical groups disestablished in 1990
Japanese heavy metal musical groups
Japanese glam metal musical groups
Musical groups from Hokkaido
1982 establishments in Japan
1990 disestablishments in Japan